Tina Rudolph (born 21 May 1991) is a German physician and politician of the Social Democratic Party (SPD) who has been serving as a member of the Bundestag since 2021.

Early life and education
Rudolph was born 1991 in Wolgast and grew up in Usedom. She studied medicine (2010–2017), political science (2014–2017) and philosophy (2014–2017) at the University of Jena. During her studies, she completed internships at the Livingstone Central Hospital in Livingstone (Zambia) and the Philippine General Hospital in Manila (Philippines).

From 2018 to 2021, Rudolph worked as parliamentary advisor to Edgar Franke.

Political career
Rudolph was elected to the Bundestag in 2021, representing the Eisenach – Wartburgkreis – Unstrut-Hainich-Kreis district. She has since been serving on the Health Committee and its Subcommittee on Global Health.

In addition to her committee assignments, Rudolph has been one of the founding members of a cross-party group promoting a One Health approach since 2022.

Within her parliamentary group, Rudolph belongs to the Parliamentary Left, a left-wing movement.

Other activities
 German Foundation for World Population (DSW), Member of the Parliamentary Advisory Board (since 2022)
 International Physicians for the Prevention of Nuclear War (IPPNW), Member
 Médecins Sans Frontières, Member
 German United Services Trade Union (ver.di), Member

References

Living people
1991 births
Social Democratic Party of Germany politicians
Members of the Bundestag 2021–2025
21st-century German politicians
21st-century German women politicians
People from Wolgast